Which Medical Device is a review site for medical devices with reviews, medical device news and videos of medical procedures. Users can rate and review medical devices listed on the website, or suggest devices for inclusion and review. The website also publishes device reviews from an editorial team and encourages users to submit detailed reviews. Device manufacturers pay a fee to submit expanded product information to the website.

History

Which Medical Device was launched in September 2010 by Dr Philip Haslam (an Interventional Radiologist based at the Freeman Hospital, Newcastle upon Tyne, United Kingdom) alongside colleague Mr Craig Gerrand and business partner Steve Walmsley. The site incorporates content from the Which Interventional Device website that Dr. Haslam founded in 2007. Which Medical Device currently covers devices in the fields of Interventional Radiology, Cardiology,  Orthopaedics and Anaesthesia and Critical care.

References

External links
Which Medical Device website

British medical websites